S62 may refer to:

Aircraft 
 Blériot-SPAD S.62, a French biplane trainer
 Savoia-Marchetti S.62, an Italian flying boat
 Sikorsky S-62, an American helicopter

Other uses 
 S62 (Long Island bus)
 S62 (New York City bus) serving Staten Island
 S62 (star), in the constellation Sagittarius
 BMW S62, an automobile engine
 , a fast attack craft
 , a submarine of the Indian Navy
 S62: If swallowed, do not induce vomiting: seek medical advice immediately and show this container or label, a safety phrase
 Tonga language (Mozambique)
 S62, a postcode district for Rotherham, England